Caio Eduardo de Mello Cazziolato, also commonly known as Caio Cazziolato, or simply as "Caio" (born 18 September 1974) is a Brazilian former professional basketball player. With the senior Brazilian national basketball team, Cazziolato competed at the 1996 Summer Olympics, and the 1998 FIBA World Cup.

References

1974 births
Living people
Brazilian men's basketball players
Olympic basketball players of Brazil
Basketball players at the 1996 Summer Olympics
Basketball players from São Paulo
1998 FIBA World Championship players